Zatrephes atrata is a moth of the family Erebidae. It was described by Walter Rothschild in 1910. It is found in Guyana.

References

 

Phaegopterina
Moths described in 1910
Moths of South America